The flat-headed cat (Prionailurus planiceps) is a small wild cat native to the Thai-Malay Peninsula, Borneo, and Sumatra. It is an Endangered species, because the wild population probably comprises fewer than 2,500 mature individuals, with small subpopulations of no more than 250 adults. The population inhabits foremost wetlands, which are being destroyed and converted. For these reasons, it is listed on the IUCN Red List since 2008.

It was initially placed in the genus Felis, but is now considered one of the five species in Prionailurus.

Flat-headed cats are very rare in captivity, with seven individuals kept in Batu Secret Zoo, Songkhla Zoo, and Taiping Zoo, as recorded by Species360.

Characteristics 
The flat-headed cat is distinguished at once by the extreme depression of the skull, which extends along the nose to the extremity of the muzzle, the sides of which are laterally distended. The general habit of body is slender, and the extremities are delicate and lengthened. The head itself is more lengthened and cylindrical than in the domestic cat. The distance between the eyes and the ears is comparatively great. The cylindrical form and lateral contraction of the head is contrasted by an unusual length of the teeth. The canine teeth are nearly as long as in a domestic cat twice as large.

The thick fur is reddish-brown on top of the head, dark roan brown on the body, and mottled white on the underbelly. The face is lighter in color than the body, and the muzzle and chin are white. Two prominent buff whitish streaks run on either side of the nose between the eyes. The ears are rounded. The eyes are unusually far forward and close together, compared with other cats, giving the felid improved stereoscopic vision. The teeth are adapted for gripping onto slippery prey, and the jaws are relatively powerful. These features help the flat-headed cat to catch and retain aquatic prey, to which it is at least as well adapted as the fishing cat. Legs are fairly short. Claws are retractable, but the covering sheaths are so reduced in size that about two-thirds of the claws are left protruding.

The anterior upper premolars are larger and sharper relative to other cats. The interdigital webs on its paws help the cat gain better traction in muddy environments and water, and are even more pronounced on this cat than those on the paws of the fishing cat.

It weighs .

Distribution and habitat 

The flat-headed cat's distribution is restricted to lowland tropical rainforests in extreme southern Thailand, Peninsular Malaysia, Sumatra and Borneo. It primarily inhabits freshwater habitats near coastal and lowland areas.

This detection suggests that the flat-headed cat is more tolerant of changes in its surrounding environment than previously assumed. As Pasoh Forest Reserve contains no major rivers or lakes and is generally covered by hill dipterocarp forest, this detection provides new evidence of the flat-headed cat's potential habitat range. The reserve ranks as low probability of occurrence in a previously published species distribution model.

In Sarawak, a flat-headed cat was sighted and photographed on the bank of Maludam River in Maludam National Park in 2013.

In Kalimantan, flat-headed cats were recorded in mixed swamp forest and tall interior forest at elevations below  in the vicinity of Sabangau National Park.

Ecology and behavior 

Flat-headed cats recorded in Kalimantan were foremost active by night.
They are presumably solitary, and probably maintain their home ranges by scent marking. In captivity, both females and males spray urine by walking forward in a crouching position, leaving a trail on the ground. Anecdotal historical accounts report that they are nocturnal, but an adult captive female was crepuscular and most active between 8:00 and 11:30 and between 18:00 and 22:00 hours.
 
The stomach contents of an adult shot on a Malaysian riverbank consisted only of fish. They have been observed to wash objects, raccoon-style. Captive specimens show much greater interest in potential prey in the water than on dry land, suggesting a strong preference for riverine hunting in their natural habitat. Their morphological specializations suggest that their diet is mostly composed of fish, but they are reported to hunt for frogs, and are thought to catch crustaceans. They also catch rats and chickens.

Vocalizations of a flat-headed cat kitten resembled those of a domestic cat. The vocal repertoire of adults has not been analyzed completely, but they purr and give other short-ranged vocalizations.

Their gestation period lasts about 56 days. Of three litters recorded in captivity, one consisted of two kittens; the other two were singletons. Two captive individuals have lived for 14 years.

Threats 
The flat-headed cat is primarily threatened by wetland and lowland forest destruction and degradation. Causes of this destruction include human settlement, forest transformation to plantations, draining for agriculture, pollution, and excessive hunting, wood-cutting, and fishing. In addition, clearance of coastal mangroves over the past decade has been rapid in tropical Asia. The depletion of fish stocks from overfishing is prevalent in many Asian wetland environments and is likely to be a significant threat. Expansion of oil palm plantations is currently viewed as the most urgent threat.

It is also threatened by trapping, snaring, and poisoning. Flat-headed cats have been captured in traps set out to protect domestic fowl.

Although flat-headed cats are not known to be a specific target for poachers in Southeast Asia, side-catch poaching in small snares might pose an additional threat for the species. In fragmented landscapes, motor vehicle collisions and direct competition with domestic cats could pose more serious threats.

Conservation 
The flat-headed cat is included on CITES Appendix I. It is fully protected by national legislation over its range, with hunting and trade prohibited in Indonesia, Malaysia, and Thailand.

Taxonomy 
The scientific name Felis planiceps was proposed by Nicholas Aylward Vigors and Thomas Horsfield in 1827, who first described a skin of a flat-headed cat specimen collected in Sumatra. 
Prionailurus was proposed by Nikolai Severtzov in 1858 as generic name for spotted wild cats native to Asia. He proposed the generic name Ictailurus for the flat-headed cat.

In 1951, Ellerman and Morrison-Scott grouped the flat-headed cat with the fishing cat (P. viverrinus), assuming it occurs in Lower Siam, Patani, the Malay States, Sumatra and Borneo. It was subordinated to the genus Prionailurus by Ingrid Weigel in 1961 who compared fur patterns of wild and domestic cats. It was grouped into Ictailurus in 1997 following a study on mitochondrial genes of cat species.

Phylogeny 
Both models agree in the rusty-spotted cat (P. planiceps) having been the first cat of the Prionailurus lineage that genetically diverged, followed by the flat-headed cat and then the fishing cat.

The following cladogram shows their phylogenetic relationship as derived through analysis of nuclear DNA:

See also 
 Sunda Islands

References

External links 

Prionailurus
Mammals described in 1827
Carnivorans of Malaysia
Mammals of Indonesia
Mammals of Thailand
Fauna of Sumatra
Mammals of Borneo
Articles containing video clips
Taxa named by Nicholas Aylward Vigors